Christiania Township may refer to the following townships in the United States:

 Christiania Township, Minnesota, in Jackson County
 Christiania Township, North Dakota, in Burleigh County